The 1985 Villanova Wildcats football team represented Villanova University in the 1985 NCAA Division III football season. It was the program's first season since 1980, as the team had been discontinued for four years due to perceived lack of financial resources to compete at the Major College (now Football Bowl Subdivision) level. They were led by first-year head coach Andy Talley. Villanova played a "light" schedule against four NCAA Division III opponents and the United States Naval Academy JV team. The Wildcats finished the year 5–0.

Schedule

References

Villanova
Villanova Wildcats football seasons
College football undefeated seasons
Villanova Wildcats football